The 2019 Alsco 300 is a NASCAR Xfinity Series race held on April 6, 2019, at Bristol Motor Speedway in Bristol, Tennessee. Contested over 300 laps on the  concrete short track, it was the seventh race of the 2019 NASCAR Xfinity Series season. This was also the season's first Dash 4 Cash race, which would award extra money to the race winner.

Background

Track

Bristol Motor Speedway, formerly known as Bristol International Raceway and Bristol Raceway, is a NASCAR short track venue located in Bristol, Tennessee. Constructed in 1960, it held its first NASCAR race on July 30, 1961. Despite its short length, Bristol is among the most popular tracks on the NASCAR schedule because of its distinct features, which include steep banking, an all concrete surface, two pit roads, and stadium-like seating.

Dash 4 Cash
The Dash 4 Cash is a series of races in the NASCAR Xfinity Series. The 2019 format included four races where only the top four points eligible drivers in the previous race could be eligible to win a $100,000 bonus on top of their race winnings if they won the race. In addition, Cup Series regulars were not permitted to compete in the races. 

For this race, Michael Annett, Christopher Bell, Chase Briscoe and Tyler Reddick were eligible for Dash 4 Cash as they placed in the top four in the 2019 My Bariatric Solutions 300 amongst regular season drivers. The highest-finishing Dash 4 Cash eligible driver at Bristol would receive the bonus and move on to have a shot at the prize at the next race, along with the top three finishing series regulars from this race. This format continued for the two races afterwards at Talladega and Dover.

Entry list

Practice

First practice

Final practice

Qualifying

Qualifying results

. – Eligible for Dash 4 Cash prize money

Race

Summary
Cole Custer began on pole, but Justin Allgaier overtook him and would dominate the first two stages and lead the most laps. In Stage 1, Jeff Green got loose under Ross Chastain, causing heavy damage and eliminating both cars. Allgaier would later suffer from mechanical problems and crash out of the race despite his early dominance.

A caution with 40 laps to go occurred after Harrison Burton cut a tire in his first Xfinity series race. Brandon Jones stayed out and assumed the lead. Christopher Bell, sporting newer tires, passed Jones with 17 laps to go and battled with Tyler Reddick. In the end, Bell would win the race and extra prize money after holding off Reddick, who would finish second for the second consecutive race.

At the next race, Bell, Reddick, Custer, and Briscoe would have the chance at the extra prize money for placing in the top 4 for this race.

Stage Results

Stage One
Laps: 85

Stage Two
Laps: 85

Final Stage Results

Stage Three
Laps: 130

. – Won the Dash 4 Cash prize money and subsequently qualified for the Dash 4 Cash prize money in the next race.

. – Qualified for Dash 4 Cash prize money in the next race.

References

NASCAR races at Bristol Motor Speedway
Alsco 300 (Bristol)
Alsco 300 (Bristol)
2019 NASCAR Xfinity Series